Scythris cramella is a moth of the family Scythrididae. It was described by Kari Nupponen in 2009. It is found in Uzbekistan. The habitat consists of sandy deserts.

Description
The wingspan is 8.5-10.5 mm. The forewings are pale creamy beige, slightly darker in females. There are irregular dark beige areas at the dorsal half of the wing at 0.2, 0.5 and at the tornus, defining two large whitish-beige patches between the fold and the dorsum at one-third and two-thirds. The hindwings are whitish beige, the basal half paler. Adults have been recorded on wing in mid-July.

Etymology
The species name refers to the creamy-white ground colour of the forewings and is derived from Latin cramum (meaning cream colour).

References

cramella
Moths described in 2009
Moths of Asia